Gogita Gogatishvili (born 2 February 1990) is a Georgian professional footballer who plays for FC Tbilisi City.

References

External links 
 
 
 Profile at Dinamo Minsk website

1990 births
Living people
Footballers from Tbilisi
Footballers from Georgia (country)
Expatriate footballers from Georgia (country)
Expatriate footballers in Armenia
Expatriate footballers in Belarus
Association football midfielders
FC Sioni Bolnisi players
FC Chikhura Sachkhere players
FC Gagra players
FC Gandzasar Kapan players
FC Dinamo Minsk players
FC Dila Gori players
FC Zugdidi players